Los Santos Reyes ("The Saint Kings") is a 1959 Mexican film. It stars Sara García.

External links
 

1959 films
Mexican Western (genre) films
1950s Spanish-language films
1950s Mexican films